The American Accounting Association (AAA) promotes accounting education, research and practice. Founded in 1916 as the American Association of University Instructors in Accounting, its present name was adopted in 1936. The Association is a voluntary group of persons interested in accounting education and research.

The council comprises the largest gathering of accountants in academia.  Aside from working in academia, AAA also branches into: information systems, artificial intelligence/expert systems, Public Interest, auditing, taxation (the American Taxation Association is a Section of the AAA), international accounting, and teaching and curriculum.

AAA publishes six issues of The Accounting Review per year in January, March, May, July, September, and November. Other publications include Accounting Horizons.

Leadership 
The Board of Directors (2019-2020) consists of 12 members. The current president is Terry Shevlin and is also a professor at the Paul Merage School of Business at the University of California-Irvine. The other leadership positions are: President-Elect, Past-President, Vice President of Finance, Vice President of Finance-Elect, Vice President of Research & Publications, Vice President of Education, Director of Focusing on Membership, Director of Focusing on International, Director of Focusing on Segments, Director of Focusing on Intellectual Property, and Director of Focusing on Academics and Practitioner Interaction.

References

External links

Accounting organizations
1916 establishments in the United States
Professional associations based in the United States
Learned societies of the United States